Sunrise Over Tiananmen Square is a 1998 short animated documentary directed by Shui-Bo Wang and distributed by the National Film Board of Canada. It is an autobiography about the director's life, career and ultimate disillusionment with the Chinese Communist Party. It was nominated for an Academy Award for Best Documentary Short, but lost to The Personals.

Other honours for the film included the Gemini Award for Best History/Biography Documentary program, the Yorkton Film Festival Golden Sheaf Award for Best Documentary Short Subject,  and the award for Best Short Documentary at Hot Docs.

References

External links

 Watch the film online at NFB.ca

1998 films
1998 documentary films
English-language Canadian films
Documentary films about historical events
Canadian short documentary films
Canadian animated documentary films
Chinese documentary films
1989 Tiananmen Square protests and massacre
Canadian Screen Award-winning television shows
National Film Board of Canada documentaries
Films about Chinese Canadians
Autobiographical documentary films
Documentary films about China
National Film Board of Canada short films
1990s English-language films
1990s Canadian films